Torang (also Romanized as Ţorang; also known as Tarank) is a village in Dashtab Rural District, in the Central District of Baft County, Kerman Province, Iran. At the 2006 census, its population was 300 people, in 77 families.

References 

Populated places in Baft County